Qian Haiyue (1901 – 14 January 1968) was a Chinese historian who focused on the Southern Ming dynasty.

Early life 
Qian was born in the city of Wuxi Jiangsu Province. Qian's father held the Jinshi title under the imperial exams system.  In 1925, Qian graduated from Peking University after completing his studies under celebrated scholars such as Liang Qichao and Gu Hongming.

Career 
He is best known for his work "History of Southern Ming dynasty".

By 1943, he was the Principal of Xinjiang University. Qian was a victim of the cultural revolution in 1968. After he was wrongly accused of supporting the nationalist party, Qian was thrown off the main gate of the mausoleum of the Ming emperor Zhu Yuanzhang, since he is an active advocate of the study of Ming history.

References 

Republic of China historians
1901 births
1968 deaths
People's Republic of China historians
Writers from Wuxi
Educators from Wuxi
Historians from Jiangsu
Victims of the Cultural Revolution